Hell Ship Mutiny is a 1957 American South Seas adventure film directed by Lee Sholem and Elmo Williams starring Jon Hall who also produced and narrated the film. It is a compilation of a 1955 unsold television pilot Knight of the South Seas. Hall's father Felix Locher plays the role of a native chief.

This film is now in the public domain.

Plot
Captain Jim Knight, and his crew Roxy, Tula, and a chimp named Salty sail the South Seas in search of adventure.  They discover a criminal gang has taken over a small island, forcing the native pearl divers to dive beyond safe limits.

After capturing the three-man gang, Knight takes them to Tahiti for trial where the men escape and force Knight to sail them to New Zealand.  Knight subdues them again but this time a minor French magistrate is sent to the island to try them there.  The magistrate joins the criminals when a native boy locates the wreck of a lost ship containing a Burmese king's treasure.

Cast

Production
In October 1955 Jon Hall, who had just finished starring in Ramar of the Jungle, announced he would play a sea captain in a new TV series Knight of the South Seas. It would be made by his own production company, Lovina. In December Hedda Hopper reported that Hall had already shot footage in the south seas and signed his first co-star, John Carradine.

Filming started 15 December 1955 at Fox Western Avenue studios. Two episodes were filmed.

In May 1956 Hall announced the series would premiere in Tahiti, where Hall grew up.

The pilot was not picked up so Hall combined the episodes for a feature film.

Reception
The Monthly Film Bulletin said "apart from the fights and good underwater shots this juvenile adventure film sadly lacks vitality."

See also
 Public domain film
 List of American films of 1957
 List of films in the public domain in the United States

References

External links
 
 

1957 films
1957 adventure films
Republic Pictures films
American black-and-white films
Films set in Oceania
Seafaring films
Television pilots not picked up as a series
American adventure films
Films scored by Paul Sawtell
1950s English-language films
1950s American films